The 2016 United States Senate election in Connecticut was held November 8, 2016, to elect a member of the United States Senate to represent the State of Connecticut, concurrently with the 2016 U.S. presidential election, as well as other elections to the United States Senate in other states and elections to the United States House of Representatives and various state and local elections.

Incumbent Democratic Senator Richard Blumenthal won re-election to a second term in office.   Blumenthal's final vote total of 1,008,714 at the time made him the largest vote-receiver in the history of statewide elections in the state (Blumenthal’s record was later broken by then Vice President Joe Biden in the 2020 Presidential election, Biden received 1,080,680 votes). He also became the first person ever to exceed 1 million votes in the history of statewide elections in Connecticut. He remains the highest voter-receiver in the history of statewide elections besides the presidency.

Democratic nomination

Candidates

Declared 
 Richard Blumenthal, incumbent U.S. Senator

Republican nomination

Declared 
 Dan Carter, State Representative

Withdrew at convention 
 Jack Orchulli, CEO and co-founder of a Michael Kors apparel company and nominee for the U.S. Senate in 2004

Failed to qualify 
 August Wolf, investment executive and former Olympic athlete

Declined 
 Larry Kudlow, economist, television personality and columnist
 Linda McMahon, businesswoman, former CEO of WWE, and nominee for U.S. Senate in 2010 and 2012
 Rob Simmons, Stonington First Selectman, former U.S. Representative and candidate for U.S. Senate in 2010
 Joe Visconti,  former West Hartford Town Councilor, nominee for CT-01 in 2008 and Independent candidate for Governor in 2014
 David Walker, former Comptroller General of the United States and candidate for Lieutenant Governor in 2014

Republican convention 
The Republican state convention was held May 9, 2016, at the Connecticut Convention Center to select candidates for the U.S. Senate and U.S. House of Representatives. State Representative Dan Carter received the nomination with 76.7% of the delegate vote. Neither Jack Orchulli nor August Wolf received the necessary 15% of the delegate vote necessary to be granted an automatic primary on August 9, 2016.  In the first round of voting, August Wolf received 179 delegate votes, equalling 15.1% and qualifying for a primary.  However, before balloting closed, Jack Orchulli dropped from the race and publicly endorsed Dan Carter, urging his candidates to switch their votes.  During the vote switching, an additional 56 delegates that had voted for Wolf also switched their vote, dropping him well below the 15% threshold

On May 11, 2016, Wolf announced an attempt to force a primary by collecting the signatures of 8,079 registered Republicans by June 7.  However, on June 21, 2016, it was announced that Wolf failed to reach the required signature threshold to force a primary, and he conceded the Republican nomination to Dan Carter as a result.

Convention results

Endorsements

General election

Debates

Predictions

Polling 

with August Wolf

with Larry Kudlow

Results 

x

References

External links 
Official campaign websites
 Richard Blumenthal (D) for Senate
 Dan Carter (R) for Senate

Senate
Connecticut
2016